William Smart (10 April 1853 – 19 March 1915) was a Scottish economist. Initially inspired by Thomas Carlyle and John Ruskin, Smart was a conveyor of the thought of the Austrian School, before being won-over to the neoclassicalism of Alfred Marshall.

Smart, eldest son of Alexander Smart and grandson of Reverend William Smart, was born in Barrhead, Scotland.

Works
 An Introduction to the Theory of Value on the Lines of Menger, Wieser, and Böhm-Bawerk (1891, 1910).
 The Return to Protection (1904)

References

External links
 

1853 births
1915 deaths
British economists
Scottish economists
Neoclassical economists
Austrian School economists
People from Barrhead
Guild of St George